Hawaiioscia is a genus of woodlouse known from the Hawaii, Rapa Nui, and Costa Rica. The genus was originally described from Hawaii on the presence of four troglobitic species on separate islands. A species within this genus was then described from Rapa Nui which lacked troglobtic traits, but only persists in cave-dwelling relict populations. Surprisingly, another species was then described from along the Pacific Coast of Costa Rica.

Species 
Species within this genus include:

 H. rapui (Rapa Nui)
 H.  parvituberculata (Maui)
 H. microphthalma (Oahu)
 H. paeninsulae (Molokai)
 H. rotundata (Kauai)
 H. nicoyaensis (Costa Rica)

References

Woodlice
Crustacean genera